The Vatnsfirðings (or Vatnsfirðingar) were one of the most influential family clans in twelfth century Iceland during the period of the Icelandic Commonwealth.  Their domain of influence was the town of Ísafjörður and its environs.

References

 Árni Daníel Júlíusson, Jón Ólafur Ísberg, Helgi Skúli Kjartansson Íslenskur sögu atlas: 1. bindi: Frá öndverðu til 18. aldar Almenna bókafélagið, Reykjavík 1989

Icelandic family clans